Alcathous (Ancient Greek: Ἀλκάθοος) was the name of several people in Greek mythology:
 Alcathous, a Calydonian prince as the son of King Porthaon and Euryte, daughter of Hippodamas. He was the brother of Oeneus (successor of Porthaon), Agrius, Melas, Leucopeus, and Sterope. Alcathous was the second suitor of Hippodamia, and thus slain by her father Oenomaus like the other suitors except Pelops.
 Alcathous, possible son of Agrius who together with his brother Lycopeus, died at the hands of his cousin, Tydeus who went then into exile to Argos.
Alcathous, son of Pelops, who killed the Cithaeronian lion.
 Alcathous, one of the guardians of Thebes. He was killed by Amphiaraus during the war of the Seven against Thebes.
 Alcathous, a Trojan soldier in the company of Paris and Agenor. He was son of Aesyetes and husband of Hippodamia, sister of Aeneas. Alcathous' mother may be Cleomestra, daughter of Tros, and thus, brother to Antenor and Assaracus. Alcathous was slain by Idomeneus, king of Crete.
 Alcathous, another Trojan warrior, killed by Achilles in the Trojan War.
 Alcathous, one of the companions of Aeneas. He was killed by Caedicus, one of the warriors of Turnus.
 Alcathous, another, otherwise unknown personage of this name is mentioned by Virgil.

See also 

2241 Alcathous

Notes

References 

 Apollodorus, The Library with an English Translation by Sir James George Frazer, F.B.A., F.R.S. in 2 Volumes, Cambridge, MA, Harvard University Press; London, William Heinemann Ltd. 1921. ISBN 0-674-99135-4. Online version at the Perseus Digital Library. Greek text available from the same website.
Diodorus Siculus, The Library of History translated by Charles Henry Oldfather. Twelve volumes. Loeb Classical Library. Cambridge, Massachusetts: Harvard University Press; London: William Heinemann, Ltd. 1989. Vol. 3. Books 4.59–8. Online version at Bill Thayer's Web Site
 Diodorus Siculus, Bibliotheca Historica. Vol 1-2. Immanel Bekker. Ludwig Dindorf. Friedrich Vogel. in aedibus B. G. Teubneri. Leipzig. 1888–1890. Greek text available at the Perseus Digital Library.
 Homer, The Iliad with an English Translation by A.T. Murray, Ph.D. in two volumes. Cambridge, MA., Harvard University Press; London, William Heinemann, Ltd. 1924. . Online version at the Perseus Digital Library.
Homer, Homeri Opera in five volumes. Oxford, Oxford University Press. 1920. . Greek text available at the Perseus Digital Library.
 Pausanias, Description of Greece with an English Translation by W.H.S. Jones, Litt.D., and H.A. Ormerod, M.A., in 4 Volumes. Cambridge, MA, Harvard University Press; London, William Heinemann Ltd. 1918. . Online version at the Perseus Digital Library
Pausanias, Graeciae Descriptio. 3 vols. Leipzig, Teubner. 1903.  Greek text available at the Perseus Digital Library.
 Publius Papinius Statius, The Thebaid translated by John Henry Mozley. Loeb Classical Library Volumes. Cambridge, MA, Harvard University Press; London, William Heinemann Ltd. 1928. Online version at the Topos Text Project.
 Publius Papinius Statius, The Thebaid. Vol I-II. John Henry Mozley. London: William Heinemann; New York: G.P. Putnam's Sons. 1928. Latin text available at the Perseus Digital Library.
 Publius Vergilius Maro, Aeneid. Theodore C. Williams. trans. Boston. Houghton Mifflin Co. 1910. Online version at the Perseus Digital Library.
 Publius Vergilius Maro, Bucolics, Aeneid, and Georgics. J. B. Greenough. Boston. Ginn & Co. 1900. Latin text available at the Perseus Digital Library.
 Quintus Smyrnaeus, The Fall of Troy translated by Way. A. S. Loeb Classical Library Volume 19. London: William Heinemann, 1913. Online version at theio.com
 Quintus Smyrnaeus, The Fall of Troy. Arthur S. Way. London: William Heinemann; New York: G.P. Putnam's Sons. 1913. Greek text available at the Perseus Digital Library.

Trojans
Characters in the Aeneid
Characters in Seven against Thebes
Aetolian characters in Greek mythology
Theban characters in Greek mythology